Northwood School is a coeducational secondary school and sixth form located in the Northwood area of the London Borough of Hillingdon,  England. .

History
The school was originally opened in January 1934 as Potter Street Senior Council School with an age range from 11 to 14. The original headmaster was Mr. A. T. Smith, who had previously headed a school in Ruislip. The name Northwood School was adopted in the late 1970s.

In September 2009, Northwood was federated with Queensmead School, located in South Ruislip. Graeme Atkins became the new principal and the school improved with 2009, 2010, 2011, 2012 and 2013 all culminating with the best GCSE results in the school's history. The school has now become among the best in the London Borough of Hillingdon, and among the 100 most improved schools in Britain. A-Level results also continued to rise for Post-16 students since the federation in 2009, with substantial emphasis on progression to higher education. Although a smaller school compared with several other local secondary schools, it was praised for its environment in which every student was made to feel safe noted in the 2011 Ofsted report.

Previously a foundation school administered by Hillingdon London Borough Council, in February 2012 Northwood School converted to academy status. The school is now sponsored by the QED Academy Trust. The school was then selected as the site of a brand new aviation college in association with British Airways and Brunel University. Demolition work of the old buildings began in September 2013 and the new complex, named 'Heathrow Aviation Engineering University Technical College' (Heathrow Aviation Engineering UTC), was officially opened in May 2015.

2013 marked the fifth successive year where the school broke its record for GCSE attainment with 97% of students achieving five A*'s to C grades, and 73% achieved this with passes in the core subjects. 2014 was also a record breaking year for the school. Principal Graeme Atkins departed the school in the summer of 2014 after five years at the helm to become Headteacher at Queen Elizabeth High School, Hexham. Mark Anderson became Principal from April 2015.

In 2014, it was confirmed that Northwood School had received the go ahead of a £28 million project to re-build the entire school with modern, state of the art facilities, with scheduled completion of the new complex in September 2016.

Notable former pupils
The Olympic boxer Audley Harrison and Big Brother contestant Nikki Grahame are all alumni of the school.

References

External links
Northwood School website
Northwood School BBC report 2017

Academies in the London Borough of Hillingdon
Secondary schools in the London Borough of Hillingdon